The Holy Magi Syro-Malabar Catholic Forane Church is situated in the center of Muvattupuzha, Kerala, India. The church is under eparchy of Kothamangalam. The current vicar of church is Fr.Paul Nedumpurath.

History

In the first quarter of 19th century after circuit to the northern region the king's administrators were returning to south in ‘Manchal’ accompanied by the pedestrian forces. When they reached Muvattupuzha it was getting dark. They had to reach Koothattukulam, the nearby inn for their stay. The team was upset for want of adequate lamps. Geevarghese Kathanar of Arakuzha Pittapillil family helped them by arranging torches made of dry coconut leaves. As an expression of gratitude for this, the ‘Adhikari’ recommended Achan to the king. Achan was invited to the palace and honoured with a ‘vadi and pidi’ (stick with a grip). Considering of goodwill of Kathanar, the king allotted some land for the construction of a church. On 27 July 1820, the ancient form of the present church, a small chapel, came into existence. With timely repairs, renewals and renovations the church attained its present growth. Apart from the native Christians who mainly hail from Arakuzha and Mylakompu Foranes, who are the majority of the church laity. Syrian Christian Achayans from Palai, Mannathoor, Veliyannoor, Nediyasala and other places migrated to this land and a powerful Syrian Catholic community made its roots there.

Religious organisations
 CML
 Yuvadeepthy
 St. Vincent De Paul Society
 Carmelita 3rd Order
 Mathrudeepthy
 AKCC
 Thirubalasakiyam

Educational institutions
 Nirmala Higher Secondary School
 Nirmala Public School
 Little Flower L.P. School
 Nirmala College

Parishes under forane
 St. Sebastian Syro-Malabar Catholic Church, Anicadu
 BVM Rosary Syro-Malabar Catholic Church, Karakunnam
 St. George Syro-Malabar Catholic Church, Marady
 St. Jude Syro-Malabar Catholic Church, Mekkadampu
 St. Joseph Syro-Malabar Catholic Church, Mudavoor
 Nirmala Matha Syro-Malabar Catholic Church, East Muvattupuzha
 St. Michael Syro-Malabar Catholic Church, Randar
 St. Max. Kolbe Syro-Malabar Catholic Church, East Vazhappilly

Daily Qurbana times

See also
 Muvattupuzha
 Syro Malabar Church
 Arakuzha
 Kothamangalam
 Syro-Malabar Catholic Diocese of Kothamangalam
 Nirmala College, Muvattupuzha
 Catholic Church

References

External links
 Syro-Malabar Church Internet Mission
 Eparchy of Kothamangalam
 Holy Magi Church, Muvattupuzha Parish details

Archdiocese of Ernakulam-Angamaly
Syro-Malabar Catholic dioceses
Christian organizations established in 1957
Roman Catholic dioceses and prelatures established in the 20th century
Religious organizations established in the 1640s
Churches in Ernakulam district
1957 establishments in Kerala